Adam Jeremy Oppenheimer (born April 17, 1980) is an American plastic surgeon and medical researcher known previously for his research in craniofacial surgery and current work in labiaplasty surgery.

Early life and education 
Oppenheimer was born to Cynthia and Randolph Oppenheimer.  He has four brothers.  His grandfather, Samuel Shatkin, was past-president of the American Society for Maxillofacial Surgeons.  

He attended Amherst High School where he was an All-American lacrosse goaltender. He went on to play lacrosse at Yale University, where he also sang with the collegiate a capella singing group The Whiffenpoofs. He graduated from Yale University with a bachelor’s degree in 2002.

He attended medical school at the University of Rochester and finished in 2006, and proceeded on to a residency at the University of Michigan and fellowship training in plastic surgery at the University of Washington in 2012.

Career 
Oppenheimer began practicing  in Central Florida obtaining board certification in 2014, and fellowship with the American College of Surgeons.

He has been featured in several print news outlets, giving his medical opinions on plastic surgery-related topics. Oppeinheimer also appeared on Orlando’s News6 news program and an episode of the TruTV television series You’re So Vain. He has also served as an assistant professor of plastic surgery at the University of Central Florida.

In 2021 and 2022, he was ranked #21 and #11, respectively in Newsweek’s list of America’s Best Plastic Surgeons in liposuction. He also ranked #55 in rhinoplasty in 2022. He is known for sharing labiaplasty surgery on Snapchat, which has been criticized for promoting the aesthetic modification of normal anatomy through its use of before-and-after photos of procedures.

His research publications have been cited almost 1000 times according to Google Scholar.

Selected publications 

 Shatkin, T. E., Shatkin, S., Oppenheimer, B. D., & Oppenheimer, A. J. (2007). Mini dental implants for long-term fixed and removable prosthetics: a retrospective analysis of 2514 implants placed over a five-year period. Compendium of continuing education in dentistry (Jamesburg, NJ: 1995), 28(2), 92-9.
 Oppenheimer, A. J., Tong, L., & Buchman, S. R. (2008). Craniofacial bone grafting: Wolff's law revisited. Craniomaxillofacial trauma & reconstruction, 1(1), 49-61.
 Clavijo-Alvarez, J. A., Pannucci, C. J., Oppenheimer, A. J., Wilkins, E. G., & Rubin, J. P. (2011). Prevention of venous thromboembolism in body contouring surgery: a national survey of 596 ASPS surgeons. Annals of plastic surgery, 66(3), 228.
 Oppenheimer, A. J., Monson, L. A., & Buchman, S. R. (2013). Pediatric orbital fractures. Craniomaxillofacial trauma & reconstruction, 6(1), 9-20.
 Ettinger, R. E., Oppenheimer, A. J., Lau, D., Hassan, F., Newman, M. H., Buchman, S. R., & Kasten, S. J. (2012). Obstructive sleep apnea after dynamic sphincter pharyngoplasty. Journal of Craniofacial Surgery, 23(7), S32-S34.
 Oppenheimer, A.J., & Shatkin, S. (2016). S.M.A.R.T Aesthetics. (n.p.),  ISBN 978-0-692-77829

References 

1980 births
Living people
American plastic surgeons
American medical researchers